At the 1964 Summer Olympics in Tokyo, four diving events were contested during a competition that took place at the Yoyogi National Gymnasium, from 11 to 18 October, comprising 80 divers from 20 nations.

Medal summary
The events are named according to the International Olympic Committee labelling, but they appeared on the official report as "springboard diving" and "high diving", respectively.

Men

Women

Medal table

Participating nations
Here are listed the nations that were represented in the diving events and, in brackets, the number of national competitors.

See also
 Diving at the 1963 Pan American Games

Notes

References

 
 

 
1964 Summer Olympics events
1964
1964 in water sports